Bristol South East was a constituency in the city of Bristol that returned one Member of Parliament (MP) to the House of Commons of the Parliament of the United Kingdom.

The constituency was created for the 1950 general election, mainly from the Bristol East constituency, and abolished for the 1983 general election which saw the reintroduction of Bristol East. In boundary changes for the February 1974 general election, part of the constituency's territory was transferred to the new seat of Kingswood.

Sir Stafford Cripps won the seat comfortably from holding its main predecessor in 1950 and continued in government with the new seat for just over six months (he was at the time Chancellor of the Exchequer) before resigning from Parliament due to health reasons. The final MP for the constituency was Tony Benn who served as Secretary of State (for Industry from 1974 to 1975 then as Secretary of State For Energy from 1975 to 1979), in the latter role, the UK saw the Winter of Discontent and power shortages.  Benn ran in the near-overlapping successor seat, Bristol East in 1983 and was defeated by Conservative candidate Jonathan Sayeed.

Boundaries
1950–1955: The County Borough of Bristol wards of Brislington, Hengrove, St George East, and St George West.

1955–1974: The County Borough of Bristol wards of Brislington, St George East, St George West, and Stockwood, and the Urban District of Kingswood.

1974–1983: The County Borough of Bristol wards of Brislington, Knowle, St George East, St George West, Stockwood, and Windmill Hill.

Members of Parliament

Elections

Elections in the 1950s

Elections in the 1960s 

Tony Benn was declared ineligible to sit in the House of Commons due to his having inherited a peerage, and Malcolm St. Clair was declared elected instead.

Elections in the 1970s

Notes and references
Notes 
  
References

South East
Parliamentary constituencies in South West England (historic)
Constituencies of the Parliament of the United Kingdom established in 1950
Constituencies of the Parliament of the United Kingdom disestablished in 1983